"Just Smoke" is a song by English rock band Mumford & Sons. It was released as the fifth and final single from their third studio album, Wilder Mind, on 1 February 2016. The song peaked at number 137 on the UK Singles Chart.

Track listing

Chart performance

Release history

References

2016 singles
2016 songs
Mumford & Sons songs